Okanagana rubrovenosa is a species of cicada in the family Cicadidae. It is found in North America, most often in Arizona, California, Oregon, and Utah. It is orange in black in color, but can lose its color as it ages.

References

Further reading

 

Articles created by Qbugbot
Insects described in 1915
Okanagana